Arthur R "Mockingbird" Miles (August 28, 1904 – June 15, 1984) was an American singer of cowboy songs in the 1920s. He died in Loraine, Texas.

Born in Jasper, Texas, Miles is credited with independently utilizing a style of overtone singing, similar to the Tuvan style called sygyt, as a supplement to the normal yodeling of Country Western music.

Two recordings from 1929 exist that are attributed to Miles. The recordings are the first and second parts of a tune titled "Lonely Cowboy".

References

External links 

 
 Khoomei.com: Information on various throat singing styles and artists
 Recording of Arthur Miles from Khoomei.com
 Internet radio show comparing Arthur Miles Lonely Cowboy to Tuvan throat singing.  Or is it just humming and whistling? Pat Conte of The Secret Museum of Mankind fields the question.

American country singer-songwriters
Spoken articles
1904 births
1984 deaths